First Yashwantrao Chavan ministry could refer to one of the following:
 First Yashwantrao Chavan ministry (Bombay State), 1956–57
 First Yashwantrao Chavan ministry (Maharashtra), 1960–62